Kerri Gardin (born May 19, 1984) is an American professional basketball player. She most recently played the forward position for the Washington Mystics in the WNBA.

College career
Gardin was born in Burke County, North Carolina. As a Senior at Freedom High School she led her team to the 2002 North Carolina 4A girls state championship and was named North Carolina Miss Basketball for the 2001–02 season.  At Virginia Tech, Gardin led her Hokies to four consecutive NCAA appearances. As a senior, she averaged a double-double with 12.7 points and 10.0 rebounds per game. Her performance at the university led to her induction into the Virginia Tech Sports Hall of Fame.

Gardin is currently employed as an assistant women's basketball at coach Mars Hill University in Mars Hill, North Carolina.

Virginia Tech statistics
Source

WNBA career
Gardin was drafted 34th overall in the 2006 WNBA Draft by the Chicago Sky. Before the season started, the Sky waived her. Before the 2007 WNBA season, Gardin was signed by the Seattle Storm. Like in Chicago, she was waived by the Storm before seeing any regular season action. In 2008, the Connecticut Sun signed Gardin as a free agent. She retained a roster spot and went on to start 15 games, helping the Sun post a 21–13 overall record. In the 2008 WNBA Playoffs, Gardin ranked first in the league in steals per turnover (5.0).

She played for Jolly JBS Sibenik in Croatia during the 2008–09 WNBA off-season.

References 

1984 births
Living people
American expatriate basketball people in Croatia
American women's basketball players
Basketball players from North Carolina
Chicago Sky draft picks
Connecticut Sun players
People from Burke County, North Carolina
Small forwards
Virginia Tech Hokies women's basketball players
Washington Mystics players